The 2011 Ironman 70.3 World Championship was a triathlon competition that was held at Lake Las Vegas in Henderson, Nevada on September 11, 2011. It was sponsored by the United States Marine Corps and organized by the World Triathlon Corporation. The championship race was the culmination of the Ironman 70.3 series of events that occurred from October 1, 2010 to August 15, 2011. Athletes, both professional and amateur, earned a spot in the championship race by qualifying in races throughout the 70.3 series. The 2011 Championship marked the first year that the race was not held in Clearwater, Florida, which had hosted the race since its inception in 2006.

Medallists

Men

Women

Qualification
The 2011 Ironman 70.3 Series featured 38 events that enabled qualification to the 2011 World Championship event. Professional triathletes qualified for the championship race by competing in races during the qualifying year, earning points towards their pro rankings. An athlete’s five highest scoring races are counted toward their pro rankings. The top 50 males and top 30 females in the pro rankings qualified for the championship race.

Amateur triathletes could also qualify for the championship race by earning a qualifying slot at one of the qualifying events or through the Physically Challenged Lottery. Slots were allocated to each age group category, male and female, with the number of slots given out based on that category's proportional representation of the overall field. Each age group category was assured one qualifying spot at each qualifying event. Some 70.3 events also serve as qualifiers for the full Ironman World Championships in Hawaii.

While the 70.3 Series continued its gradual expansion in 2011, with the number of qualifying races the overall number of qualifiers remained the same from the previous year. This was due to the Championship event being moved up from its previous November slot on the calendar to September causing many of the new and previously established events to instead act as qualifiers for the 2012 Championship race. Those new events added as part of the 2011 series include races in Busselton, Western Australia; Port Macquarie, New South Wales; Pescara, Italy; Mallorca, Spain; San Juan, Puerto Rico; Miami; Jeju, South Korea; and Muncie, Indiana as well as the Asia-Pacific Championship in Phuket.

Qualifying Ironman 70.3s

†
‡
∗

China cancellation
On May 12, 2011, the WTC announced that the 2011 Ironman China and Ironman 70.3 China races, scheduled for May 29 in Jixian, Tianjin Province, China, were canceled. The Tianjin Sports Bureau (TSB) was unable to obtain the required sanctions from the China Triathlon Sports Association (CTSA) to conduct the event. Murphy Reinschreiber, managing director of the Asia Pacific region for WTC stated that "TSB simply failed to provide all of the documentation necessary for CTSA to process the sanction." WTC is offering a full refund of entry fees to all athletes who were scheduled to compete at Ironman China and Ironman 70.3 China.  Additionally, all athletes were offered a complimentary race entry into any of the 2011 Ironman and Ironman 70.3 races. WTC is allocating the age group qualifying slots from Ironman China and Ironman 70.3 China to other races in the region to ensure that athletes from the Asia-Pacific region are represented at the 2011 World Championship events.

2011 Ironman 70.3 Series results

Men

∗

Women

∗

References

External links
Ironman 70.3 Series website

Ironman World Championship
Ironman
Triathlon competitions in the United States
Sports competitions in Nevada
Ironman 70.3 World Championship